Germa (Greek Γέρμα) or Germokoloneia (Γερμοκολώνεια, from Latin Colonia Iulia Augusta Felix Germenorum) was an ancient and Byzantine city in the Roman province of Galatia Secunda. The Byzantine writer Theophanes informs us that at a later period Germa took the name of Myriangeli. The few archaeological remains lie close to present-day Babadat in Eskişehir Province, Turkey.

When between 25 and 20 BCE Augustus made Galatia a Roman province, he founded Germa as a Roman colony. The city was situated at the point where the road from Ancyra forked, one branch going to Dorylaeum, the other to Pessinus. From the time of Domitian it had a mint. Its Christian bishopric was a residential see until the 12th century and is now, as "Germa in Galatia", a titular see of the Catholic Church.

References

External links 
 Encyclopaedia of the Hellenic World: "Germa"
 Coins of Germa

20s BC establishments in the Roman Empire
Catholic titular sees in Asia
Galatia (Roman province)
Roman towns and cities in Turkey
Populated places of the Byzantine Empire
Former populated places in Turkey
Coloniae (Roman)
Populated places in ancient Galatia
Populated places established in the 1st century BC
History of Eskişehir Province
Sivrihisar District